Daniel Knudsen is an American film director, actor and film producer. He is also a co-founder of Crystal Creek Media.

Biography 
Daniel Knudsen was born in Dearborn, Michigan. His father is a commercial airline pilot and his mother was a former saleswomen for Michigan Bell. In 2005 he began his involvement with movies and later went on to study digital media production in college. He graduated from Thomas Edison State University in 2009 and has worked in the film industry ever since.

Knudsen is a practicing Christian and attends a Presbyterian church.

Career 
Kundsen began his career working as an intern on films while he was still in highschool. The first feature he directed was the thriller Creed of Gold. The film was nominated for an Adam Award for best feature drama at the Sabaoth International Film Festival in Milan, Italy and won a Redemptive Storyteller Award at the Redemptive Film Festival. Since then he has produced and directed other films including Indescribable, Christmas Grace, Courageous Love and Christmas Coupon. Knudsen is also an actor and has made cameo appearances in many of his own films. He has taught filmmaking and acting at the Christian Worldview Film Festival in San Antonio, Texas.

Filmography 
Director
Late for Church (2007)
Creed of Gold (2014)
A Horse Called Bear (2015)
Courageous Love (2017)
Christmas Coupon (2019)
SKYDOG (2020)
Dinosaur Cove (film) (2022)

Producer
Late for Church (2007)
Indescribable (2013)
Unexpected Places (2013)
Christmas Grace (2014)
The King's Messengers (2017)
Christmas Coupon (2019)
SKYDOG (2020)
Dinosaur Cove (film) (2022)

Actor

References

External links 

Living people
1988 births
American film directors
American male film actors
Male actors from Detroit
American entertainment industry businesspeople
Thomas Edison State University alumni
American people of Danish descent
American people of Polish descent